Michael or Mike O'Mara may refer to:

Michael O'Mara (musician) (born 1985), original guitarist and backup vocalist of the American indie rock band Sleepaway
Mike O'Mara (politician), member of St. Louis County Council
Michael J. O'Mara (1840–1892), lawyer and politician in Newfoundland
Michael O'Mara Books